The 2012 World Cup Taekwondo Team Championships is the 4th edition of the World Cup Taekwondo Team Championships, and was held at Centro Deportivo Betico Croes in Santa Cruz, Aruba from November 23 to November 25, 2012.

Medalists

Men

Preliminary round

Group A

Group B

Group C

Group D

Knockout round

Women

Preliminary round

Group A

Group B

Group C

Knockout round

References

External links
World Taekwondo Federation

World Cup
Taekwondo World Cup
World Cup Taekwondo Team Championships
Taekwondo Championships